Chop Chop is a series of iOS video games developed by Gamerizon since 2009. The games in the series cover a wide variety of game types, primarily action and sports games, though they generally share a common art style. According to Gamerizon, 15 million "Chop Chop" games were downloaded by 2011 on the App Store and six of those have been downloaded a million times each.

The series of games soon became Canadian television series on Teletoon and produced by Sardine Productions.

Games
All games listed were released by Gamerizon for iOS.

Animation

Shorts

In 2012, Gamerizon announced that an animated series based on Chop Chop Ninja was in development with Canadian broadcaster Teletoon. The following year, Teletoon officially ordered a series of 40 ninety-second shorts produced by Sardine Productions called Chop Chop Ninja Challenge. A longer form series was also announced to be in development.

Chop Chop Ninja Challenge debuted on Teletoon and Télétoon in Canada on November 8, 2014. The series was later aired in over 100 markets globally.

TV series

Following the success of the shorts, Teletoon greenlit the longer form series in March 2016. Once again made by Sardine Productions, the series, simply called Chop Chop Ninja, consists of 40 eleven-minute episodes or 20 twenty-two-minute episodes. It debuted on Télétoon on September 1, 2018. The English-language premiere aired on Teletoon on October 6, 2018.

Episodes

Intersitials (2014) 
There are nine interstitial episodes. Each character does the challenge and the interstitials air for one-and-a-half minutes.

 Hang a Picture (November 8, 2014)
 Catch the Fly (November 15, 2014)
 Catch the Fish (November 22, 2014)
 Get Candy (November 29, 2014)
 Light the Torch (December 6, 2014)
 Steal the Golden Egg (December 13, 2014)
 Put the Monkey in the Barrel (December 20, 2014)
 Ring the Bell (December 27, 2014)
 Save the Waka (January 3, 2015)
 Extinguish the Volcano (January 10, 2015)

Season 1 (2018) 

 Season 1 premiered in Canada on October 5, 2018.

References

Action video games
IOS games
Video games about ninja
Platform games
Teletoon original programming
2014 Canadian television series debuts
2014 Canadian television series endings
2018 Canadian television series debuts
2018 Canadian television series endings